Lugogo may refer to:

 Lugogo, Kampala, a neighborhood in Kampala, Uganda's capital
 Lugogo Channel, a wetland in Kampala, drains into Lake Victoria
Lugogo River, a river of Uganda
Lugogo Stadium, a stadium in Kampala, Uganda
The ring name of the American professional wrestler David Sammartino